The zone rouge (English: Red Zone) is a chain of non-contiguous areas throughout northeastern France that the French government isolated after the First World War. Rather than attempt to immediately clean up the former battlefields, the land was allowed to return to nature. Restrictions within the Zone Rouge still exist today, although the control areas have been greatly reduced.

The zone rouge was defined just after the war as "Completely devastated. Damage to properties: 100%. Damage to Agriculture: 100%. Impossible to clean. Human life impossible".

Under French law, activities such as housing, farming, or forestry were temporarily or permanently forbidden in the Zone Rouge, because of the vast amounts of human and animal remains, and millions of items of unexploded ordnance contaminating the land. Some towns and villages were never permitted to be rebuilt after the war.

Main dangers
The area is saturated with unexploded shells (including many gas shells), grenades, and rusty ammunition. Soils were heavily polluted by lead, mercury, chlorine, arsenic, various dangerous gases, acids, and human and animal remains. The area was also littered with ammunition depots and chemical plants.

Each year, several tons of unexploded shells are recovered. According to the Sécurité Civile agency in charge, at the current rate, 300 to 700 more years will be needed to clean the area completely.  Some experiments conducted in 2005–06 discovered up to 300 shells per hectare (120 per acre) in the top 15 cm (6 inches) of soil in the worst areas.

Some areas where 99% of all plants still die remain off limits (for example, two small pieces of land close to Ypres and the Woëvre), as arsenic constitutes up to 175,907 mg/kg of soil samples where arsenical shells were destroyed in the 1920s.

See also

 French villages destroyed in the First World War
 Involuntary park
 Iron harvest
 No man's land

References

Further reading
 Smith, Corinna Haven & Hill, Caroline R. Rising Above the Ruins in France: An Account of the Progress Made Since the Armistice in the Devastated Regions in Re-establishing Industrial Activities and the Normal Life of the People. New York: GP Putnam's Sons, 1920: 6.
 De Sousa David, La Reconstruction et sa Mémoire dans les villages de la Somme 1918–1932, Editions La vague verte, 2002, 212 pages
 Bonnard Jean-Yves, La reconstitution des terres de l'Oise après la Grande Guerre: les bases d'une nouvelle géographie du foncier, in Annales Historiques Compiégnoises 113–114, pp. 25–36,  2009.
 Parent G.-H., 2004. Trois études sur la Zone Rouge de Verdun, une zone totalement sinistrée  I.L'herpétofaune – II.La diversité floristique – III.Les sites d'intérêt botanique et zoologique à protéger prioritairement. Ferrantia, 288 pages
 Bausinger, Tobias; Bonnaire, Lee Tiffee, Eric; & Preuß, Johannes,. Exposure assessment of a burning ground for chemical ammunition on the Great War battlefields of Verdun, Science of the Total Environment 382:2–3,  pp. 259–271, 2007.

External links
 Map of the Western Front in 1918 
 Déminage à Douaumont 
 National Geographic: France’s Zone Rouge is a Lingering Reminder of World War I 

Battle of the Somme
Ecotoxicology
Environment of France
Environmental disasters in Europe
France geography articles needing translation from French Wikipedia
Geography of Somme (department)
World War I sites in France
Soil contamination